Saleh Suleiman (1888 – 24 November 1980) was an Israeli Arab politician who served as a member of the Knesset for Progress and Work between 1955 and 1959.

Biography
Suleiman was born in Reineh during the Ottoman era. He was elected to the Knesset in 1955 on the Progress and Work list, and was a member of the Internal Affairs Committee, before losing his seat in the 1959 elections.

He died on 24 November 1980.

External links

1888 births
1980 deaths
Arab members of the Knesset
Arab people in Mandatory Palestine
Arabs in Ottoman Palestine
Members of the 3rd Knesset (1955–1959)
People from Reineh
Progress and Work politicians